The 2010 S.League season is Geylang United's 15th season in the top flight of Singapore football and 35th year in existence as a football club. The club will also compete in the Singapore League Cup, Singapore Cup and the AFC Cup.

Squad

Pre-Season Transfer

In

Out

Mid-Season Transfer

In

Out

Coaching staff

Pre-Season Friendlies

S.League

Round 1

Round 2

Round 3

Singapore League Cup

Singapore Cup

AFC Cup

References

Geylang International FC
Geylang International FC seasons